Vincent Vermeij (born 9 August 1994) is a Dutch professional footballer who plays as a forward for SC Freiburg II.

Club career

Ajax
Vincent Vermeij was born and raised in Blaricum, where he joined the youth of HSV De Zuidvogels in nearby Huizen. He joined the youth ranks of Ajax in 2012, and signed his first professional contract with Ajax on 4 July 2013, a one-year contract running until 30 June 2014.
At first instance Vermeij joined the newly promoted reserves team Jong Ajax, playing in the Dutch Eerste Divisie, the second tier of professional football in the Netherlands. He made his debut for Jong Ajax in the regular season away match against MVV Maastricht on 17 August 2013. The match ended in 1–0 loss for the Amsterdam side. He scored his first professional goal for Jong Ajax in his second appearance in a match against Jong Twente on 30 August 2013, scoring in the 38th minute of the 2–1 win at home.

De Graafschap
On 31 January 2014, it was announced that Vermeij had transferred to the club from Doetinchem for an undisclosed fee. He signed a 2.5-year contract with his new club having made 17 league appearances for the Ajax reserves squad, while scoring three goals. He scored his first goal for his new club on 7 February 2014 in an away match against FC Oss which ended in a 2–2 draw.

MSV Duisburg
In the summer of 2019, he moved to MSV Duisburg. He left Duisburg at the end of the 2020–21 season.

SC Freiburg II
He signed for SC Freiburg II for the 2021–22 season.

Career statistics

References

External links

Voetbal International profile 

1994 births
Living people
People from Blaricum
Dutch footballers
Association football forwards
Netherlands under-21 international footballers
Eredivisie players
Eerste Divisie players
3. Liga players
AFC Ajax players
De Graafschap players
Heracles Almelo players
FC Den Bosch players
MSV Duisburg players
SC Freiburg II players
Dutch expatriate footballers
Dutch expatriate sportspeople in Germany
Expatriate footballers in Germany
Footballers from North Holland